Flavius Anastasius Paulus Probus Moschianus Probus Magnus was a Byzantine statesman.

Biography
He may have been the brother of Flavius Anastasius Paulus Probus Sabinianus Pompeius Anastasius, consul in 518. If so, Anastasius was the son of Sabinian, consul in 505, and of a niece of emperor Anastasius I, making him the emperor's grandnephew.

He served as consul in 518.

Family
His daughter Juliana was married to Marcellus (brother of Justin II).

References

 Croke, Brian, Count Marcellinus and His Chronicle, Oxford University Press, 2001, p. 89.
 Martindale, John R., "Fl. Anastasius Paulus Probus Sabinianus Pompeius Anastasius 17", The Prosopography of the Later Roman Empire, vol. II, Cambridge University Press, 1992, pp. 82–83.
 Christian Settipani :fr:Continuité des élites à Byzance durante les siècles obscurs. Les princes caucasiens et l'Empire du VIe au IXe siècle, 2006
 

6th-century Byzantine people
6th-century Roman consuls
Imperial Roman consuls
Year of birth unknown
Year of death unknown